Gilia inconspicua is a species of flowering plant in the phlox family known by the common name shy gilia. It is native to the western United States, where it grows in sandy, open areas such as sagebrush and plateau.

This is a small herb with a spreading, branched stem reaching a maximum height of about 30 centimeters. The leaves are mainly basal and are divided into small smooth-edged or toothed leaflets. The leaves and lower stem may be strung with cobweb-like fibers.

The upper part of the stem around the inflorescence has a coat of black, hairlike gland fibers. Small flowers appear at the ends of the stem branches. Each is lavender with a yellowish throat.

External links

Jepson Manual Treatment
Photo gallery

inconspicua
Flora of the Western United States
Flora of Oregon
Flora of the California desert regions
Flora without expected TNC conservation status